Macy's West is a longtime division of Macy's, Inc. (formerly Federated Department Stores), representing one of the New York-based department store chain's earliest notable acquisitions and westward expansions. Headquartered in San Francisco, California, this particular group of Macy's store locations included 258 sites by February 2, 2009, when the company announced plans to consolidate all Macy's divisions into a single division based in New York. The consolidation became effective during the second quarter of 2009.

The division contained locations in Arizona, California, Colorado, Guam, Hawaii, Idaho, Montana, Nevada, New Mexico, Oregon, western Texas, Utah, Washington, and Wyoming, incorporating a mix of acquired chains and newly built stores.  When it was consolidated, Macy's West was headed by Chairman Jeffrey Gennette, President Robert B. Harrison, and Vice Chairman and Director of Stores Rudolph J. Borneo. As of February 2, 2009, the total gross square feet of the Macy's West stores totaled 40.331 million, employing 46,700 individuals.

History 
Macy's West was established in San Francisco, California in 1866 as O'Connor, Moffat, Kean Co. at Second & Market Streets, eventually moving into several buildings on south Post Street, between Grant Avenue and Kearny Street, where it rebuilt after the 1906 San Francisco earthquake and reopened in March 1909.  In 1928, the company, by then known as O'Connor, Moffat & Co., commissioned a new location at 101 Stockton Street. R.H. Macy & Company, New York, New York acquired O'Connor Moffat in 1945 and on October 16, 1947 renamed the store Macy's San Francisco.  Macy's followed up with a major expansion of the store at 170 O'Farrell Street in 1948, using the original architect of the 1928 building, Louis Parson Hobart.

Macy's Northern California expansion began in 1952 when it purchased a small San Rafael based department store named Albert's.  Albert's had a location on Fourth street in downtown San Rafael, and another in Richmond.  Both of these were relatively small in size and did not carry a full line of merchandise.  In 1954 Macy's built its first full-line Northern California branch at Hillsdale Shopping Center in San Mateo, California.  After that, the company expanded throughout Northern California, primarily the San Francisco Bay Area, but also opening stores in Sacramento, Fresno, Stockton and Modesto in the 1960s and 1970s.  Along the way, the newly renamed Macy's California ventured into shopping center development with Valley Fair in San Jose and Bayfair in San Leandro.  In 1971, the San Francisco store pioneered the cellar (always in lowercase) as the marketing concept for its housewares department, which was (and still is) in the basement.  The brand has spread to all housewares departments at all Macy's stores, although not all such stores actually have a basement in which the department can be physically sited.

In 1978, Macy's expanded into Nevada with a new store in Reno, Nevada.  In 1984, four complementary locations were acquired from Liberty House, including Liberty House's own O'Farrell & Stockton flagship built in 1974, which eventually became Macy's Men's Store.

I. Magnin/Bullock's acquisition
In 1986 R.H. Macy's management team led a buyout of the company.  Concurrently, Macy's California began to seek locations in Southern California. These plans were put on hold after Macy's purchased the Bullock's, Bullocks Wilshire and I. Magnin organizations from Campeau Corp. in 1988.  Campeau had bested Macy's own attempted acquisition of Federated Department Stores and sold these California divisions to Macy's as part of their settlement.

I. Magnin, whose San Francisco flagship adjoined Macy's, was consolidated with Bullocks Wilshire to form an autonomous specialty-department store subdivision under Macy's California.  Many of I. Magnin's smaller, dated locations were shuttered and in 1989 the Bullocks Wilshire stores assumed the I. Magnin name.  In a test case, the I. Magnin at South Coast Plaza in Costa Mesa, California was converted to a stand-alone Bullock's Men's store in 1991.

The traditional Bullock's department stores were operated initially as part of the new Macy's South/Bullock's division based in Atlanta, Georgia, but in late 1991 R.H. Macy announced plans to re-aligned its divisional structure and create a new Macy's West/Bullock's in 1992.

On January 27, 1992 R.H. Macy & Co. declared bankruptcy.  During the next two years, as Macy's reorganized, the Macy's West division continued to expand, opening a location at Mall of America in late 1992, in addition to assuming the management of the Bullock's stores and the Macy's locations in Texas.  Bullock's closed locations in Lakewood, La Mesa and Santa Ana, California at this time, while the I. Magnin group shuttered eleven more stores of its dwindling franchise. The historic Bullocks Wilshire store closed in early 1993.

Federated Department Stores merger
In 1994 Federated Department Stores reached agreement with R.H. Macy's creditors to buy the company out of bankruptcy court, completing the acquisition in December 1994 and making Macy's West/Bullock's a division of Federated.  Even before the acquisition closed, Federated announced the closure of the remaining I. Magnin stores, eventually selling four stores to Saks Fifth Avenue and converting six former I. Magnin locations in Palo Alto, Walnut Creek, Woodland Hills, Palm Desert, Newport Beach and Palos Verdes to specialty Macy's or Bullock's locations.  The upper floors of the former I. Magnin store on Union Square were later converted to an expansion of Macy's West own adjoining flagship.   Federated also shuttered the sole remaining Arizona Bullock's store in Scottsdale at Camelview Shopping Center in early 1995.

Broadway Stores merger
In late summer 1995, Federated reached an agreement with Broadway Stores, Inc.'s controlling-shareholder, Chicago-based financier Sam Zell, to buy that company.  Broadway Stores was the post-bankruptcy successor of Carter Hawley Hale Stores, a Los Angeles-headquartered company that at one time owned Neiman Marcus, Bergdorf Goodman and Wanamaker's. Through the 1970s and 1980s it was the leader in both sales volume and store count in California, but had struggled in the 1990s.

The transaction was completing on October 11, 1995, and Federated subsequently announced plans to merge the organization's 83 Emporium, Weinstock's and The Broadway locations with Macy's West/Bullock's and rebrand them all with the Macy's moniker in early 1996.

Eventually 49 of the Broadway locations were converted to Macy's, either as new stores, secondary stores to complement and expand existing locations, or to replacements of existing locations.  Five of the stores which overlapped with Macy's and Bullock's at Sherman Oaks Fashion Square, Beverly Center, and Century City Shopping Center in Los Angeles, Fashion Island in Newport Beach, and Stanford Shopping Center in Palo Alto were closed and eventually reopened as Bloomingdale's.  Nine locations were sold to Sears, two were swapped with Central Valley rival Gottschalks in Modesto and Fresno, while the remaining 18 were shuttered, a few of them eventually finding new life as Target or Wal-Mart locations.  One of these locations, a former Emporium in Cupertino was re-opened as a Macy's under anti-trust pressure from the California attorney general in fall 1998.

Union Square store revival
In the late 1990s Macy's began a multi-year project to rehabilitate its landmark downtown San Francisco store.    The project encompassed the remodeling of the 1929 and 1948 buildings and the 1974 stand-alone Men's Store and expansion into the upper floors of the former I. Magnin store at Geary and Stockton built in 1946.  The company also demolished and replaced two out-of-date buildings on Geary Street, giving the store its signature glass-fronted entry on Union Square.

Liberty House acquisition
In July 2001 Federated Department Stores acquired Liberty House of Honolulu, Hawaii with department store and specialty shop locations throughout the major Hawaiian Islands, several western states as well as the territory of Guam.  The stores, including its flagship location at Ala Moana Center, were merged into Macy’s West.

May Department Stores merger
On February 28, 2005, Federated Department Stores announced an agreement to acquire long-time rival The May Department Stores Company, owner of competitor Robinsons-May.  Under an agreement with the California Attorney General, over 20 overlapping stores in California were required to be divested and put up for competitive bidding.  Many of the locations that were divested in Macy's West's territory were eventually sold to shopping center developers such as Simon Property Group, The Westfield Group and The Macerich Company.

The landmark deal was completed August 30, 2005, and on February 1, 2006, Macy's West assumed operational control of the former Robinsons-May division as well as Foley's locations in Colorado, New Mexico and El Paso, Texas.  Much of 2006 was spent integrating the newly merged operations.  The Foley's and Robinsons-May names were phased out completely on September 9, 2006 in favor of Macy's.

See also
 Macy's East
 Macy's Inc.

References

External links 
 Official website

Macy's
Companies based in San Francisco
1866 establishments in California